Atlantic Airlines may refer to:

Atlantic Airlines (Honduras), a defunct airline based in Tegucigalpa, Honduras
Atlantic Airlines (Nicaragua), a defunct airline based in Managua, Nicaragua
Atlantic Airlines (United Kingdom), an airline based in Coventry, United Kingdom
 Atlantic Air, a defunct airline also known as Business Express Airlines

See also
Atlantic Airways
Air Atlantic
Atlantic Southeast Airlines